Cockleshell Bay is a stop-motion children's television series which was shown at lunchtime on ITV during the early 1980s. It was made by Cosgrove Hall for its parent company, the ITV broadcaster Thames Television. Other children's programmes in the same ITV time slot on the remaining four weekdays included Let's Pretend, Jamie and the Magic Torch, and Rainbow – the latter is the show in which Cockleshell Bay began as a regular story feature (reflected in the rainbow design of Cockleshell Bays logo).

Twins Robin and Rosie Cockle are the main characters. They live at the Bucket and Spade guest house, run by their parents Helen and Christopher. The family has moved to the Bay from a city called Roughington, because their parents wanted to leave city life behind, and their father no longer wanted to work in a factory. Although Robin and Rosie frequently argue with each other, it is clear that they greatly enjoy each other's company. Gran Routy (who is no relation to the family, but is known as "Gran" due to her large number of grandchildren) helps out at the house. Robin and Rosie's friends include Mr. Ezikiel Shipham (known locally as Mr Ship), Mr. McGinty and his donkey Fury (whom Mr. Ship looks after), as well as Ben Gunn the "pirate seagull". In the later series Robin and Rosie have a baby sister called Holly.

Transmission guide
Series 1: 13 editions, 6 May 1980 – 29 July 1980
Series 2: 13 editions, 24 March 1981 – 16 June 1981
Series 3: 13 editions, 28 September 1981 – 21 December 1981
Series 4: 13 editions, 29 March 1982 – 21 June 1982
Series 5: 13 editions, 4 January 1983 – 5 April 1983
Series 6: 13 editions, 10 January 1984 – 3 April 1984
Series 7: 13 editions, 16 April 1985 – 9 July 1985
Series 8: 13 editions, 8 April 1986 – 1 July 1986

Episode Guide

Series 1 (1980) 
6 May 1980: "A Fresh Start"
13 May 1980: "Names"
20 May 1980: "The Pirate Seagull"
27 May 1980: "Buried Treasure"
3 June 1980: "Arrow is Arrows is Arrows"
10 June 1980: "Mortar This than Meets the Eye"
17 June 1980: "Ben Gunn Strikes Again"
24 June 1980: "Round and Round and Up and Down"
1 July 1980: "The Grand Old Duke of York"
8 July 1980: "Spring Cleaning"
15 July 1980: "Land Ho"
22 July 1980: "The House That Robin and Rosie Built"
29 July 1980: "Happy Birthday Gran Routy"

Series 2 (1981) 
24 March 1981: "Fishy Things"
31 March 1981: "The Disappearing Peas"
7 April 1981: "Something Beginning with P"
14 April 1981: "The Pirate King"
21 April 1981: "Footprints in the Sand"
28 April 1981: "Bumps and Twangles"
5 May 1981: "Beachcombing"
12 May 1981: "Rosie the Ballerina"
19 May 1981: "A Day in the Sand Dunes"
26 May 1981: "A Couple of Carpenters"
2 June 1981: "A Cart Made for Two"
9 June 1981: "The Grown Ups' Secret"
16 June 1981: "Cockleshell Bay Concert"

Series 3 (1981) 
28 September 1981: "The Mystery of the Talking Donkey"
5 October 1981: "Mr Ship's New Crew"
12 October 1981: "Ben Gunn Goes Missing"
19 October 1981: "Shirts, Socks and Sunshine"
26 October 1981: "Mr Ship's African Adventure"
2 November 1981: "Robin and Rosie at the Gallop"
9 November 1981: "Gran Routy Bowls Them Over"
16 November 1981: "Rock and Roll Robin"
23 November 1981: "Robin and Rosie Hit the Trail"
30 November 1981: "Tea Time Troubles"
7 December 1981: "In the Cart"
14 December 1981: "The Boatyard Sailors"
21 December 1981: "A Cockleshell Christmas"

Series 4 (1982) 
29 March 1982: "The Cockleshell Cooks"
5 April 1982: "Deep Sea Divers"
12 April 1982: "Football Crazy"
19 April 1982: "The Birthday Secret"
26 April 1982: "Fury Comes to Tea!"
3 May 1982: "Robin the Vet"
10 May 1982: "A Dressing-Up Day"
17 May 1982: "The Eight-Wheeled Cockles"
24 May 1982: "Nurse Rosie"
31 May 1982: "Stage Struck"
7 June 1982: "Cockleshell Keep-Fit"
14 June 1982: "The Well-Groomed Donkey"
21 June 1982: "Carnival!"

Series 5 (1983) 
4 January 1983: "Dust Sheet Dramas"
11 January 1983: "Dad's Marathon"
18 January 1983: "Gypsy Rose Routy"
25 January 1983: "Flying High"
1 February 1983: "The Treasure Hunt"
8 February 1983: "Alleys and Dobbers"
15 February 1983: "Ben Gunn Gets Busy"
22 February 1983: "Another Boxing Day"
1 March 1983: "Mr Cockle's Common Cold"
8 March 1983: "It's in the Air"
15 March 1983: "Words, Words, Words"
22 March 1983: "Long Ears and Tall Stories"
29 March 1983: "The Cockleshell Easter Fayre"

Series 6 (1984) 
10 January 1984: "Tyred Out"
17 January 1984: "Ostriches and Obstacles"
24 January 1984: "Squeak, Squeak!"
31 January 1984: "Holed in One"
7 February 1984: "Robin and Rosie Clean Up"
14 February 1984: "Tea Trays and Tumbles"
21 February 1984: "The Vikings are Coming!"
28 February 1984: "Skates Alive!"
6 March 1984: "Spinners and Conkers"
13 March 1984: "Easy as Toffee Apples!"
20 March 1984: "Iceberg on the Port Bow"
27 March 1984: "A Frosty Day"
3 April 1984: "Under Canvas"

Series 7 (1985) 
16 April 1985: "Footprints and Floorcloths"
23 April 1985: "The Attic"
30 April 1985: "Paste and Paper Everywhere"
7 May 1985: "Moving In"
14 May 1985: "A New Friend"
21 May 1985: "Donkey is on the Loose"
28 May 1985: "Buon Giorno, Signora!"
4 June 1985: "False Alarm"
11 June 1985: "A Name for Baby Cockle"
18 June 1985: "The Magpie Braves"
25 June 1985: "Lost and Found"
2 July 1985: "Drawing and Winning"
9 July 1985: "A Puzzle... and a Party"

Series 8 (1986) 
8 April 1986: "Holly on the Loose"
15 April 1986: "Taming of the Lion"
22 April 1986: "Steaming Ahead"
29 April 1986: "The Puppet Show"
6 May 1986: "Mr Cockle Cooks"
13 May 1986: "Shopping and Shipwrecks"
20 May 1986: "A Day at the Chariot Races"
27 May 1986: "Storms at Sea"
3 June 1986: "Ben Gunn's New Feathers"
10 June 1986: "Dr. Mario"
17 June 1986: "Blow Me Down"
24 June 1986: "Holly Catches a Train"
1 July 1986: "Never Been 21 Before"

VHS releases

Credits 
 Writer and narrator Brian Trueman
 Music David Rohl, Stuart J. Wolstenholme
 Animation Andrea Lord, Steve Moss
 Puppet design Bridget Appleby 
 Illustrations Josie Yee & Ivor Wood
 Sets & props Chris Walker
 Puppet construction Peter Saunders
 Camera Jim Noble, Jane Hilcks 
 Film editor John McManus
 Executive producer John Hambley
 Director Jackie Cockle
 Producers Mark Hall, Brian Cosgrove
 Copyright 1980, 1981, 1982, 1983, 1984, 1985, & 1986 Cosgrove/Hall Productions Ltd 
Thames Colour Production

External links
 
 Cockleshell Bay at ClassicKidsTV.co.uk

British stop-motion animated television series
ITV children's television shows
1980 British television series debuts
1986 British television series endings
1980s British children's television series
Television series by FremantleMedia Kids & Family
Television shows produced by Thames Television
English-language television shows
Television series by Cosgrove Hall Films